Ian Scott (born January 11, 1999) is a Canadian former ice hockey goaltender. After being drafted 110th overall by the Leafs in the 2017 NHL Entry Draft, Scott was named to the WHL (East) First All-Star Team and selected as CHL Goaltender of the Year.

Scott announced his retirement at 23 years old on July 21, 2022, citing multiple injuries over his past several seasons.

Career statistics

Regular season and playoffs

International

References

External links
 

1999 births
Living people
Canadian ice hockey goaltenders
Newfoundland Growlers players
Prince Albert Raiders players
Ice hockey people from Calgary
Toronto Maple Leafs draft picks
Toronto Marlies players
Wichita Thunder players